Božidar Maksimović (1 March 1886 18 July 1969) was a Serbian and Yugoslav lawyer and politician who performed various ministerial roles in the Government of the Kingdom of Yugoslavia, such as minister of the interior, minister without portfolio, minister of justice and minister of education.

Initially, he was a member of the People's Radical Party and later he joined the Yugoslav National Party.

Due to his "strong hand" policy, he was nicknamed "Boža Stock". He forcibly suppressed workers' strikes and student demonstrations. He was considered a court radical and brutally dealt with opponents of the monarchy and the centralist system of the state.

References 

1886 births
1969 deaths
People from Knić
University of Belgrade Faculty of Law alumni
Government ministers of Yugoslavia
People's Radical Party politicians
Yugoslav National Party politicians